This is a list of active association football clubs in Northern Cyprus as of 2019-2020 season.

Men's

Süper Lig
Alsancak Yeşilova
Baf Ülkü Yurdu
Binatlı
Cihangir
Çetinkaya
Doğan Türk Birliği
Düzkaya
Gençlik Gücü
Göçmenköy
Gönyeli
Hamitköy
Küçük Kaymaklı
Lefke
Mağusa Türk Gücü
Türk Ocağı
Yenicami

1. Lig
Bostancı Bağcıl
Çanakkale
Doğancı
Dörtyol
Dumlupınar
Esentepe
Gençler Birliği
Girne Halk Evi
Görneç
Karşıyaka
Lapta
Maraş
Mesarya
Mormenekşe
Ozanköy
Yalova

BTM 1. Lig

Beyaz Grup
Değirmenlik
Denizli
Dikmen Gücü
Düzova
Karaoğlanoğlu
Ortaköy
Tatlısu
Yılmazköy
Zümrütköy

Kırmızı Grup
Dipkarpaz
Geçitkale
İncirli
İskele Trabzon
Mehmetçik
Serdarlı
Türkmenköy
Vadili
Yarköy
Yeni Boğaziçi

BTM 2. Lig

1. Grup
Bafra
Ergazi
Kumyalı
Sipahi
Yedikonuk
Yeni Erenköy

2. Grup
Ardahan
Boğaziçi
Civisil
Ötüken
Karadeniz 61

3. Grup
Çayönü
Güvercinlik
Mutluyaka
Pergama
Pile
Yenişehir

4. Grup
Akıncılar
Dilekkaya
Gaziköy
Gönendere
Kırıkkale
Yeniceköy

5. Grup
Ağırdağ Boğaz
Alayköy Kültür
Bahçeli
Demirhan
Haspolat
Pınarbaşı

6. Grup
Akdeniz Kültür
Çamlıbel
Kalkanlı
Sadrazam Kayalar
Tepebaşı

7. Grup
Akçay
Gayretköy
Mevlevi
Serhatköy
Yeşilyurt

Under-age leagues only
Alayköy Gençlik
Büyükkonuk
Tatlısu Seracılar

Women's

Kadınlar Ligi
Akdeniz
Alsancak Yeşilova
Dumlupınar
Geçitkale
Göçmenköy
Mağusa Spor Akademisi

Inactive clubs
Akova Vuda
Aydınköy
Baf Canbulat
Balıkesir
Dağyolu
Dağyolu-Şirinevler
Tuzla
Yıldırım

See also
List of football teams

References 

Football in Northern Cyprus
 List
Northern Cyprus
Football clubs

Football clubs